Virginia Ruth Brown (March 11, 1934 – February 8, 2016) was an American nuclear physicist known for her contributions on the structure, interaction, reactions, and bremsstrahlung of nucleons and atomic nuclei. She spent most of her career as a researcher at the Lawrence Livermore National Laboratory.

Life
Brown was born on March 11, 1934, in Massachusetts, and earned a bachelor's degree at Northeastern University. She became a graduate student at McGill University, where she completed her Ph.D. in 1964 under the supervision of Bernard Margolis.

After postdoctoral research at Yale University in 1963 and 1964, she became a researcher at the Lawrence Livermore National Laboratory, working there until 1995. While at Livermore, she served as Secretary/Treasurer of the Division of Nuclear Physics from 1986 to 1995.

She was a program officer at the National Science Foundation (NSF) from 1995 to 1998. In 1998 she moved again, from the NSF to the University of Maryland, College Park as a visiting professor; she also became a researcher at the Massachusetts Institute of Technology Laboratory for Nuclear Science, working there with professor June Matthews.

She died of cancer on February 8, 2016.

Recognition
Brown was named a Fellow of the American Physical Society (APS), after a nomination from the APS Division of Nuclear Physics, in 1982. In 2003, she became the inaugural winner of the division's Distinguished Service Award, "for substantial and extensive contributions to the nuclear physics community ..., and for her role in bringing to fruition the historic first joint meeting of the nuclear physicists of the American and Japanese Physical Societies".

References

External links
In memoriam: Virginia Brown, Lawrence Livermore National Laboratory

1934 births
2016 deaths
American nuclear physicists
American women physicists
Northeastern University alumni
McGill University alumni
Lawrence Livermore National Laboratory staff
United States National Science Foundation officials